Dylan Barker is a retired professional Canadian football player who played four seasons for the Hamilton Tiger-Cats. He was the first overall pick in the 2008 CFL Draft. He currently holds the CFL All-time record for most special team tackles in a season. He was forced to retire due to a lower back injury. He now works in the dentistry industry.

References

 

1986 births
Living people
Canadian football defensive backs
Sportspeople from Moose Jaw
Players of Canadian football from Saskatchewan
Saskatchewan Huskies football players